The Dean of York is the member of the clergy who is responsible for the running of the York Minster cathedral. As well as being the head of the cathedral church of the diocese and the metropolitical church of the province, the Dean of York holds preeminence as the Province of York vicar.

Since 1939, the deans have resided at York Deanery.

List of deans
The following is a list of the deans from 11th century to the present day:

High Medieval
1093– Hugh
–1143 William of St. Barbara
–1157 Robert of Ghent
1158–1186 Robert Butevilain
1186–1189 Hubert Walter
1189–1194 Henry Marshal
1194–1214 Simon of Apulia
1214–? William Testard
– Hamo
1220–1233 Roger de Insula
1233–1238 Geoffrey de Norwich
1239–1243 Fulk Basset
1244–1249 Walter of Kirkham
–1256 Sewal de Bovil
1257–1258 Godfrey Ludham
1258–1260 Roger de Holderness (alias Skeffling)
–1279 William Langton
1279–1290 Robert de Scarborough
1290–1297 Henry of Newark

Late Medieval
1296–1307 William Hambleton
1307–1310 Raymond de Goth
1310–1312 William Pickering
1312–1333 Robert Pickering 
1333–1336 William de Colby
1336–1340 William Zouche
1342–1343 Hélie de Talleyrand-Périgord
1366–1380 Cardinal Angelicus Grimaud
1382–1385 Cardinal Adam Easton
1385–1395 Edmund Stafford
1395–1397 Roger Walden
1398–1400 Richard Clifford
1401–1406 Thomas Langley
1406–1416 John Prophet
1416–1420 Thomas Polton
1420–1425 William Grey
1426–1436 Robert Gilbert
1436–1451 William Felter
1452–1477 Richard Andrew

1477–1488 Robert Booth
1488–1494 Christopher Urswick (also Archdeacon of Wilts, and Archdeacon of Richmond (from 1494))
1494–1496 William Sheffield
1497–1503 Geoffrey Blythe

Early modern
1503–1507 Christopher Bainbridge
1508–1512 James Harrington
1513–1514 Thomas Wolsey
1514–1516 John Yonge
1516–1539 Brian Higden
1539–1544 Richard Layton
1544–1567 Nicholas Wotton
1567–1589 Matthew Hutton
1589–1617 John Thornborough
1617–1624 George Meriton
1625–1644 John Scott
1644–1660 Abolished – Commonwealth & Protectorate
1660–1663 Richard Marshe
Jan–Nov 1664 William Sancroft
1664–1677 Robert Hitch (also Archdeacon of the East Riding until 1675)
1677–1697 Tobias Wickham
1697–1702 Thomas Gale
1702–1728 Henry Finch
1728–1747 Richard Osbaldeston
1747–1802 John Fountayne

Late modern
1802–1822 George Markham
1823–1858 William Cockburn
1858–1880 Augustus Duncombe
1880–1916 Arthur Purey-Cust
1917–1925 William Foxley Norris
1926–1932 Lionel Ford
1932–1941 Herbert Bate
1941–1963 Eric Milner-White
1964–1975 Alan Richardson
1975–1984 Ronald Jasper
1984–1994 John Southgate
1994–2003 Raymond Furnell
2004–2012 Keith Jones
December 20122018 Viv Faull
25 June 20182 February 2019 Peter Moger, Canon Precentor and Acting Dean
2 February 201918 January 2022 Jonathan Frost (became Bishop of Portsmouth)
19 January 202212 November 2022 Michael Smith, Canon Pastor and Acting Dean 
12 November 2022present Dominic Barrington

References

Sources

 
 
 
 

 
Dean of York